Lawrence Gordon Abele (born March 1, 1946) is an American academic in the Department of Biological Science and the former Provost at Florida State University, where he is a distinguished professor, In 1994, he was appointed provost at Florida State, a position he held through 2010. 

Abele started his career at Florida State in the Department of Biological Sciences in 1973.  He later served as associate professor, professor, associate chairman for graduate studies, chairperson, dean and now provost.

On September 17, 2010, Abele announced that he would be stepping down as provost and vice president of academic affairs at the end of the Fall 2010 semester.

He is an active member of the Gulf of Mexico Fishery Management Council.

Education
 A.A. Dade Junior College in 1966
 B.S. Florida State University in 1968
 M.S. Florida State University in 1970
 Ph.D. University of Miami in 1972
 Post-Doctoral Fellow for the Research Institute in the Republic of Panama

External links
 Florida State University Provost profile

Notes

Living people
Florida State University alumni
Florida State University faculty
Fellows of the American Association for the Advancement of Science
1946 births
Scientists from Baltimore
University of Miami alumni
21st-century American biologists